Xylophagus junki is a species of awl fly belonging to the family Xylophagidae.

Distribution
Europe, Russia.

References

Xylophagidae
Insects described in 1932
Diptera of Europe
Diptera of Asia
Taxa named by Zoltán Szilády